Bopha Pailin  is a 1998 Khmer Boran soap opera. It is the first of its kind, being a boran TV opera followed by the second boran TV opera also starring Chan Leakennam, the 2009 Peus Snae. The opera was based on the 1951 Khmer novel Kolap Pailin which was once a film in 1962 and starred Chea Yuthon and Dy Saveth.

History 
The opera did not last very long but is an exception for its time. It is considered Chan Leakenna's 1st TV opera, she was 18 at the time.

1998 Cambodian television series debuts
1990s Cambodian television series
2000s Cambodian television series
2010s Cambodian television series
2020s Cambodian television series
Cambodian Television Network original programming